The 2019 Rally Australia (also known as Kennards Hire Rally Australia 2019) was a motor racing event for rally cars that was scheduled to be held over four days between 14 and 17 November 2019. The event was cancelled because of an ongoing bushfire emergency in the area. The event was to mark the twenty-eighth running of Rally Australia and was the final round of the 2019 World Rally Championship, WRC-2 Pro class and World Rally Championship-2. Rally Australia will not be featured in the 2020 championship.

Jari-Matti Latvala and Miikka Anttila were the defending rally winners. Their team, Toyota Gazoo Racing WRT, were the defending manufacturers' winners. Alberto Heller and José Diaz were the defending rally winners in the World Rally Championship-2 category, but did not participate in the event.

As a result of the rally's cancellation, Hyundai Shell Mobis WRT became the manufacturers' champions, while Pierre-Louis Loubet and Vincent Landais won the divers' and co-drivers' titles respectively in the WRC-2 class.

Background

Championship standings prior to the event
Newly-crowned champions Ott Tänak and Martin Järveoja led the both drivers' and co-drivers' championships with a thirty-six-point ahead of Thierry Neuville and Nicolas Gilsoul. Defending world champions Sébastien Ogier and Julien Ingrassia were third, a further ten points behind. In the World Rally Championship for Manufacturers, Hyundai Shell Mobis WRT held an eighteen-point lead over Toyota Gazoo Racing WRT.

In the World Rally Championship-2 Pro standings, newly-crowned champions Kalle Rovanperä and Jonne Halttunen led by sixty-one points in the drivers' and co-drivers' standings respectively. Mads Østberg and Torstein Eriksen were second, with Gus Greensmith and Elliott Edmondson further eight points behind in third. In the manufacturers' championship, manufacturers' champion Škoda Motorsport led M-Sport Ford WRT by seventy-four points, with Citroën Total over a hundred points behind in third.

In the World Rally Championship-2 standings, Pierre-Louis Loubet and Vincent Landais led the drivers' and co-drivers' standings by three points respectively. Kajetan Kajetanowicz and Maciej Szczepaniak were second, while Benito Guerra were third in the drivers' standings and Yaroslav Fedorov in the co-drivers' standings.

Entry list
The following crews were due to entered into the rally. The event was scheduled to open to crews competing in the World Rally Championship, World Rally Championship-2, WRC-2 Pro and privateer entries not registered to score points in any championship. A total of twenty-six entries were received, with twelve crews were scheduled to enter with World Rally Cars and three were scheduled to enter the World Rally Championship-2. This was later reduced to eleven World Rally Cars when Citroën withdrew a planned entry for Mads Østberg and Torstein Eriksen.

Route
Only five stages from the 2018 event were scheduled to return to the 2019 itinerary. Two of these were due to run in opposite direction to the 2018 rally.

Planned itinerary
All dates and times are AEDT (UTC+11).

Bushfire emergency

In the week before the rally, the New South Wales Mid North Coast region was devastated by unprecedented bushfires. Organisers of the rally announced plans to run the event over a shortened route if conditions deteriorated further, while organisers of the Australian Rally Championship — of which Rally Australia was planned to be the final round — cancelled the series' involvement in the rally. A revised itinerary featuring  of competitive stages was submitted to the FIA for approval. However, the rally was cancelled eventually.

Report

World Rally Cars

Championship standings
Bold text indicates 2019 World Champions.

World Rally Championship-2 Pro

Championship standings
Bold text indicates 2019 World Champions.

World Rally Championship-2

Championship standings
Bold text indicates 2019 World Champions.

Notes

References

External links
  
 2019 Rally Australia in e-wrc website
 The official website of the World Rally Championship

Australia
2019 in Australian motorsport
Australia
November 2019 sports events in Australia
2019